Midleton Hurling and Football Club is a Gaelic Athletic Association club based in the town of Midleton in County Cork, Ireland. The club plays in the Imokilly division of Cork GAA.

History
The concept of a Gaelic Athletic Association was first mooted in 1883 when a sub-committee of the Irish Republican Brotherhood was formed with the ideal of creating a National Athletic body. Midleton man, P.N Fitzgerald was one of the committee members who eventually set up the Gaelic Athletic Association and thus Midleton's love affair and commitment to the G.A.A. was established.

The club was formally affiliated to the association, when at the third meeting of the fledgling organisation, held in Thurles on 17 January 1885; Jeremiah J Coffey formally registered the club as Midleton Football club. The club blossomed in the early years and in 1890 brought the first senior football All Ireland title to Cork under the captaincy of Jim Power. This was an historic year in the annals of Cork G.A.A. as the hurlers, under the Aghabullogue banner also brought the hurling title to the Leeside. Exactly 100 years later their modern-day counterparts repeated this historic feat of winning the two All Ireland senior titles in the one year. Two Midleton players, Kevin Hennessy and Ger FitzGerald, were instrumental in guiding the hurlers to their victory in 1990.
The club purchased its present location from Lord Midleton in 1958 and has continuously upgraded its facilities in the meantime to make it the capital of sporting venues in east Cork and one of the finest arenas in the country. In 1975 the club's pavilion was opened and since its completion has played a vital role for the GAA and other sporting and cultural organisations within the greater east Cork area.
Following this, the club entered its greatest period in its history on the playing fields. When the Cork Intermediate Hurling Championship was annexed in 1978 the club went from strength to strength culminating in winning the All-Ireland Senior Club Hurling Championship title in 1987. Along the way, every county hurling title was won from underage to senior with the 1983 victory over St. Finbarrs being the most treasured. This was beyond the wildest dreams of anyone within the club, but the players proved it was not a one-off wonder when they fulfilled their potential by winning three other Cork Senior Hurling Championship titles in 1986, 87 and 91 beating the cream of Cork hurling along the way.

By winning the title in 1983 the club were rewarded with the captaincy of the Cork team for 1984, the centenary year of the Association. In that year the club became only the second club in the history of the G.A.A. to provide All Ireland winning senior captains in both hurling and football when John Fenton captained Cork to All Ireland victory over Offaly in Thurles. There were five other Midleton players on the Cork panel that year with Joe Desmond being chairman of the selection committee.
The 1980s and early 90s were great years for the club but after the feast came some lean years. However, following tremendous work at street league level and in the schools success is starting to flow again. While the expanding population around the area will bring its own opportunities and problems the members of Midleton G.A.A. club are determined to keep the flag of the association flying proudly within the town and wherever the games of hurling and football will take them.

In 2013, Midleton won their first Cork Senior title in 22 years after a 2–15 to 2–13 win against Sarsfields, with Conor Lehane scoring 2-10 of his club's total.

This was followed by a number of years of increasing success at underage level, including a minor championship in 2018 and a Feile title in U15 hurling in 2021.

2021 also saw Midleton win their 8th county senior hurling championship when they defeated Glen Rovers 0-24 to 1-18.

Hurling

Honours

All-Ireland Senior Club Hurling Championships: 1
 1988
Munster Senior Club Hurling Championships: 2
 1983, 1988
Cork Senior Club Hurling Championships: 8
 1914, 1916, 1983, 1986, 1987, 1991, 2013, 2021
Cork Intermediate Hurling Championships: 3
 1948, 1962, 1978
Cork Junior Hurling Championships: 4
 1917, 1945, 1984, 1990
Cork Under-21 Hurling Championships: 6
 1979, 1983, 1988, 1989, 2011, 2013
Cork Minor Hurling Championships: 7
1928, 1984, 1987, 1988, 1989, 2010, 2018
 East Cork Junior A Hurling Championships: 9
 1928, 1934, 1936, 1943, 1945, 1982, 1984, 1989, 1990

Famous Hurlers

This is a list of notable hurlers who have played for Midleton.  Generally, this means players that have enjoyed much success with the club or have played for the Cork senior hurling team.

Teams

Records and statistics

Top scorers

Gaelic football

Honours

All-Ireland Senior Football Championships: 1
 1890
Munster Senior Football Championships: 1
 1890
Cork Senior Football Championships: 2
 1889, 1890
Cork Intermediate Football Championships: 1
 1984
Cork Junior Football Championships: 3
 1896, 1917, 1939
 East Cork Junior A Football Championships: 10
 1928, 1935, 1938, 1939, 1949, 1962, 1967, 1969, 1974, 1992

References

External links
Cork GAA site
Midleton GAA site

Gaelic games clubs in County Cork
Gaelic football clubs in County Cork
Hurling clubs in County Cork
Midleton
1885 establishments in Ireland